Yakov Nikitayi Zarobyan (25 September 1908 – 11 April 1980) was the First Secretary of the Communist Party of Armenia from 1960 to 1966.

Biography 

Zarobyan was born in 1908 in Artvin, then in the Russian Empire, now in Turkey. Together with his family, he moved further into Russia during the First World War. From 1925–1941 he worked in Kharkiv as a factory worker. In 1932 he joined the Communist Party and became the party's committee secretary of the main Kharkiv factory in 1939. In 1949 he became the head of the factory's department of the Central Committee of the Communist Party.

He became Secretary of the Yerevan City Committee of the Communist Party of Armenia in July 1950 and Deputy Minister of Security of the Armenian SSR in April 1952, served as First Deputy Premier of Armenia from June 1953 to July 1958 and First Secretary of the Communist Party of Armenia from 1960 to 66. He was dismissed in February 1966 partly as a result of the huge demonstrations in Yerevan in April 1965, on the occasion of the 50th anniversary of the Armenian genocide. In 1966, he was made Soviet Deputy Minister for Electrification, effectively a demotion, and was succeeded by Anton Kochinyan.

He died in Moscow in 1980.

References

Sources
 Armenia:The Survival of a Nation

1908 births
1980 deaths
People from Artvin
People from Batum Oblast
Central Committee of the Communist Party of the Soviet Union members
First Secretaries of the Armenian Communist Party
Fourth convocation members of the Supreme Soviet of the Soviet Union
Fifth convocation members of the Supreme Soviet of the Soviet Union
Sixth convocation members of the Supreme Soviet of the Soviet Union
Party leaders of the Soviet Union
Recipients of the Order of the Red Banner of Labour

Recipients of the Order of the Red Star
Armenian atheists